The Airport Expressway, officially the S12, is a controlled-access highway in Beijing, China, which links central Beijing to the Beijing Capital International Airport. It is just under 20 km in length.

Opened in 1993, the expressway links Sanyuanqiao on the northeastern 3rd Ring Road to Beijing Airport. Another expressway, the 2nd Airport Expressway, was built in 2008 prior to the Beijing Olympics to serve traffic from the city to the airport.

Route
The Airport Expressway runs entirely within the confines of the municipality of Beijing.

Basic Route: Beijing (Sanyuanqiao - Siyuan - Beigao - Xiaotianzu - Beijing Capital International Airport)

History
The expressway opened on September 14, 1993, following a year-long construction effort which began on July 2, 1992. Previously, all traffic used the old Airport Road (G101), which was tested to the limit in the early 1990s.

This expressway has slashed driving time to the airport from the previous hour (using the old airport road) to just around 15 minutes. It is convenient and traffic is usually smooth.

Extension into the 2nd Ring Road
A 2.5 km stretch of expressway links Sanyuanqiao on the 3rd Ring Road to the area between Dongzhimen and Xiaojieqiao on the 2nd Ring Road. Construction started in 2004; it was finished in 2006.

Alternate routes
Further approach routes to the airport were built in the first decade of the 21st century. The Northern Airport Line (机场北线), completed between 2005 and 2006, connected the Jingcheng Expressway with the northern part of the airport, to form a northern approach route. The route commences at Lutong, just over halfway between the 5th Ring Road and the 6th Ring Road, on the Jingcheng Expressway. In 2008, another route, the 2nd Airport Expressway, was built between the eastern 5th Ring Road and the airport in time for the Beijing Olympics. Both routes have significantly alleviated traffic to the airport from the city proper.

Road conditions

Speed limit
Leftmost lane: minimum 100 km/h, maximum 120 km/h. Other lanes: minimum 60 – 80 km/h, maximum 100 km/h.

Tolls
The toll collection on the Airport Expressway has a contentious history. Construction was funded by the government using a bank loan in 1993, and residents began to dispute the rationale for the toll collection several years after the road was completed, doubting that the loan was paid off and that most of the revenue was actually used to pay back the loan. Despite these inquiries and complaints, the local government continued to collect tolls. The toll collection rights were eventually sold to a public corporation, the Capital Development Corporation, and the time of toll collection was lengthened by 30 years. The central government's general accounting office investigated and found that in the 14 year period (up to 2005), the total toll revenue was over 3 billion yuan; this was much higher than the original investment amount, 1.2 billion yuan. Under pressure, the local government lowered the toll from 15 to 10 yuan.

CNY 0.5/km as of 5th Ring Road intersection for sections south of the toll gate. Entire stretch from Sanyuanqiao to Beijing Capital International Airport costs CNY 5 (price for small passenger cars). As of June 2011, the Airport Express is free of charge into the city, but retains the CNY 5 fare toward the airport.
Note: For frequent users, a sensor-style Express Transit Card is available.

Lanes
6 lanes (3 up, 3 down) uniformly.

Traffic
Good during the day. Mild traffic jams during rush hour, mostly in the southern section of the road near Beijing.

Major exits
NE 2nd Ring Road, NE 3rd Ring Road, NE 4th Ring Road, Dashanzi, NE 5th Ring Road, Beigao, Xiaotianzu, Beijing Capital International Airport

Service areas
None on the expressway. The Weigou exit has a gas station close to it (on the way back to Beijing).

Connections
Ring roads of Beijing: Connects with the NE 2nd Ring Road between Dongzhimen and Xiaojieqiao, NE 3rd Ring Road at Sanyuanqiao, the NE 4th Ring Road at Siyuan, and the NE 5th Ring Road at Wuyuan Bridge.

List of exits

Listed are exits heading northeast as of Beijing (2nd Ring Road)
Symbols: ↗ = exit, ⇆ = main interchange; → = only when heading for the airport; ← = only when heading for central Beijing; ↘ = exit only; ¥ = central toll gate

 ⇆ 1: (Interchange with 3rd Ring Road) 3rd Ring Road (Sanhuanlu)
 ⇆ 2: (↘ if ←) (Interchange with 4th Ring Road) 4th Ring Road (Sihuanlu)
 ↗ 3: Dashanzi
 ⇆ 4: (↘ if ←) (Interchange with 5th Ring Road) 5th Ring Road
 ⇆ 5: (Interchange with China National Highway 101) Beigao, Shunyi
 ↗ 6: Weigou
 ↗ 7: Yanglin Road
 ¥ Xiaotianzu
 ↗ 8: (→) Xiaotianzu Road / (←) Shunyi, Tongzhou
 ↗ (→, ↘) South Apron (to Terminal 3)
 Beijing Capital International Airport (Terminals 1 and 2)

See also 
 China National Highways 
 Expressways of Beijing 
 Expressways of China

References 

Road transport in Beijing
Expressways in China